The Mayor of South Waikato officiates over the South Waikato District of New Zealand's North Island.

Jenny Shattock is the current mayor of South Waikato. She was elected in 2016, becoming the district's first female mayor.

List of mayors
There have been 3 mayors of South Waikato.

References

South Waikato
South Waikato
South Waikato District
South Waikato